The Vandenbrink GTO is a limited re-bodied version of the Ferrari 599 GTB Fiorano. This means an entirely new coachwork, designed by Michiel van den Brink of Vandenbrink Design, is fitted on the stripped chassis and drivetrain of a Ferrari 599 GTB production car. The car's styling is inspired by the 1962 Ferrari 250 GTO as a tribute. 

The new coachworks are handcrafted in aluminium by Dutch classic car restoration specialist and coachbuilder Alwin Hietbrink. Optional interior upholstery is hand-stitched by the Dutch Henk van Lith.

In cooperation with race engineer EDO Competition four versions are offered:

 the 599 GTO (5998 cc / 650 hp / 630 Nm)
 the high performance 630 GTO (6300 cc / 750 hp / 645374647 Nm)

Only 5 GTO's will be built.

References
 Vandenbrink Design official website

External links

 Sport-Auto Aktuell und Sport Vandenbrink GTO 

Sports cars